,  190, is a one-act singspiel by Franz Schubert to a libretto by Theodor Körner written for 's (1784–1814) opera of the same title that premiered in 1813 in Vienna's Theater an der Wien. Written in 1815 when Schubert was 18 years old, it was first performed on 23 September 1896, 67 years after Schubert's death, at the Dresden Court Opera.

The work consists of an overture and eight numbers for soprano, three tenors, bass, one spoken role, mixed choir and orchestra:

 (a version for voice and piano is also extant)

Recordings
Christoph Spering, Capriccio

References

External links
 

1815 operas
German-language operas
Operas by Franz Schubert
Operas
One-act operas